Dedeler (Turkish: "saints" or "grandfathers") may refer to the following places in Turkey:

 Dedeler, Çanakkale
 Dedeler, Çubuk, a village in the district of Çubuk, Ankara Province
 Dedeler, Göynük, a village in the district of Göynük, Bolu Province
 Dedeler, Gülnar, a village in the district of Gülnar, Mersin Province
 Dedeler, Karacasu, a village in the district of Karacasu, Aydın Province
 Dedeler, Mudurnu, a village in the district of Mudurnu, Bolu Province
 Dedeler, Seben
 Dedeler, Sındırgı, a village
 Dedeler, Tarsus, a village in the district of Tarsus, Mersin Province